Ronny Jane Sydney (née Metz; born July 10, 1938) is an American teacher, lawyer, and politician who represented the 15th Norfolk District in the Massachusetts House of Representatives from 1999 to 2001.

Early life and education
She was born on July 10, 1938 in Brooklyn, New York to Ruth Frankel and M. Stanley Metz.

She graduated from the University of Massachusetts Amherst with a Bachelor of Arts degree in Sociology in 1960, Newton College with a Master of Education degree in 1972, and from Boston College Law School with a Juris Doctor in 1987.

She later became a teacher working for the Brookline Public School district.

Legal career
She has practiced law in Boston and Brookline. She formerly practiced law with Israel, Van Kooy & Days, LLC.

Political career
She was a member and later chair of the Brookline Board of Selectmen from 1992 to 1998.

Massachusetts House of Representatives
In 1998, Sydney defeated 14-term incumbent John Businger in the Democratic primary for the 15th Norfolk District House seat by 35 votes. She ran unopposed in the general election.

In 2000, Sydney lost to Brookline School Committee member Frank Smizik 2,517 votes to 2,336.

Broward County Democratic Party
Between 2017 and 2018 she served as an area leader for the Broward County Democratic Party representing Coconut Creek and Margate in Florida.

Post-political career
She was later a family law attorney for the BNI Brookline Networkers. She is now retired from practicing law and resides in Coconut Creek, Florida.

References

Democratic Party members of the Massachusetts House of Representatives
Politicians from Brookline, Massachusetts
University of Massachusetts Amherst College of Social and Behavioral Sciences alumni
Boston College Law School alumni
Living people
1938 births
Massachusetts city council members
Women state legislators in Massachusetts
20th-century American politicians
20th-century American women politicians
21st-century American politicians
21st-century American women politicians
21st-century American lawyers
20th-century American lawyers
Massachusetts lawyers
People from Brooklyn
Florida Democrats
Newton College of the Sacred Heart alumni